Sari Su Rural District is in Bazargan District of Maku County, West Azerbaijan province, Iran. At the time of the National Census of 2006, its constituent villages were in Chaybasar-e Shomali Rural District. There were 4,271 inhabitants in 980 households at the following census of 2011. At the most recent census of 2016, the population of the rural district was 4,736 in 1,222 households. The largest of its 28 villages was Yarem Qayah-e Sofla, with 691 people.

References 

Maku County

Rural Districts of West Azerbaijan Province

Populated places in West Azerbaijan Province

Populated places in Maku County

fa:دهستان ساری‌سو